Palinurus mauritanicus (common name: pink spiny lobster) is a species of spiny lobster. It is found in deep waters in the eastern Atlantic Ocean and the western Mediterranean Sea.

Description 
The pink spiny lobster differs from Palinurus elephas, by its first pair of pereiopods (walking legs) that are as slender as its other pereiopods. The carapace shows two conspicuous, longitudinal rows of forward-directed spines. The peduncle, the base segment of the antenna, is particularly stout.

The pink spiny lobster may attain an age of at least 21 years.

Distribution and habitat 
It is distributed from south-western Ireland southwards throughout the western Mediterranean Sea (as far east as to Sicily, but not in the Adriatic Sea) and along the West African coast to Senegal. Palinurus mauritanicus and Palinurus elephas, are the only species of the family Palinuridae that occur both in the northeastern Atlantic Ocean and the Mediterranean Sea.

It is found on muddy or rocky bottoms at the edge of the continental shelf, but, off Europe in waters deeper than 200 m. The males seem more abundant at depths above 250 m while females and juveniles are found at greater depths.

Diet 
Palinurus mauritanicus lives as a scavenger from dead fish, but also hunts live molluscs, other crustaceans, polychaetes and echinoderms.

Reproduction 
The breeding season is between late summer and autumn, shortly after moulting. Females may carry up to 60,000 eggs. The study of larval ecology is scant. The hatching of the larvae happens after about three months as planktonic larvae (phyllosoma larvae). These larvae can be distinguished from other palinurid larvae by their pereiopods 4 and 5 being already present as small buds and by the long, non-setose exopod on pereiopod 3.

Uses 
Palinurus mauritanicus has been less the preferred target of lobster fisheries because of its relative scarcity, due to its deeper distribution. Its main fishing range is in the eastern central Atlantic off Mauritania. Its high unit value has led to depletion in the eastern central Atlantic.

References

External links 

Achelata
Crustaceans of the Atlantic Ocean
Crustaceans described in 1911